David Hoyt Canary (August 25, 1938 – November 16, 2015) was an American actor. Canary is best known for his role as ranch foreman Candy Canaday in the NBC Western drama Bonanza, and as Adam Chandler in the television soap opera All My Children, for which he received 16 Daytime Emmy Award nominations and won five times.

Early life
Canary was born in Elwood, Indiana, but grew up in Massillon, Ohio. He was the middle son of Hillary Canary and Lorena Heal. His brothers are actor John Canary, who once had a role on All My Children, and writer Hilary Glenn Canary (1934–2008). The brothers are purportedly great-great-nephews of Martha Jane Canary, Calamity Jane.

Football
Canary starred as an end on both offense and defense at Massillon Washington High School, where he graduated in 1956. The school honored him as a Distinguished Citizen 35 years later in 1991. He earned a football scholarship to the University of Cincinnati, where he was a three-year letterman from 1957 to 1959 and the recipient of the John Pease Award as the program's best lineman in his junior and senior years. Canary trained as a singer at the university's College of Arts and Sciences and received his bachelor's degree in music in 1960. He was picked by the Denver Broncos in the inaugural 1960 American Football League (AFL) draft. Commenting on the selection in a 2004 interview for the Archive of American Television, he said, "I thought they were out of their minds. I was 172 pounds, I wasn’t very fast, and I couldn’t catch a pass. They called me stone fingers."

Career
Instead of signing with the Broncos, he opted to head to New York City to become an actor. He served two years in the United States Army where he entered an All-Army Entertainment Contest in 1963. After ending his service, Canary moved to Los Angeles to continue his acting career.

Canary's most notable stage performance was on Broadway in the original production of Tennessee Williams's Clothes for a Summer Hotel, which starred Geraldine Page.

After a semiregular role as Russ Gehring in the primetime serial Peyton Place, Canary came to international prominence in 1967 on the Western series Bonanza. In 1967, he appeared in the now-classic Western movie Hombre, in which he was featured with Paul Newman, Richard Boone, and Cameron Mitchell. Canary guest-starred in the two-part episode of CBS's Gunsmoke entitled "Nitro" (S12E28-29) as “George McClaney” (a poor man who found high pay creating nitroglycerin), played mobster Frank Gusenberg in the film The St. Valentine's Day Massacre, and appeared on the short-lived CBS Western Dundee and the Culhane.

A contract dispute that year between Leonard Nimoy and the producers of Star Trek forced Herb Solow, Robert H. Justman, and Gene Roddenberry to compile a list of candidates for consideration to take over the role of Mr. Spock. As revealed in Solow and Justman's book, Star Trek - The Inside Story, Canary was one of these candidates.

David Dortort, the creator/producer of Bonanza, saw Canary in Hombre and cast him in the role of the new ranch foreman, Candy Canaday.  Dortort said that Canary was "the kind of kid who comes on and suddenly, there's nobody else on the screen". Canary left Bonanza in June 1970 after a contract dispute. He returned after Dan Blocker's death in May 1972. Canary said that he loved Bonanza, except for filming in Nevada in 100° heat.

Canary appeared on Broadway with Colleen Dewhurst in Great Day in the Morning and with Geraldine Page in Tennessee Williams's Clothes for a Summer Hotel. He did numerous musical stage roles in shows such as Kismet, Man Of La Mancha, and The Fantasticks, and dramatic performances in The Seagull and Macbeth. David's first daytime television role was on Search for Tomorrow, where he played the short-term role of Liza Walton's agent. He had two short stints on The Doctors as Far Wind, a cult leader who took the hospital staff hostage and killed Melissa Dancy (Dorian Lo Pinto). In 1981, he assumed the role of Steve Frame on the soap opera Another World. The revival of the Steve/Alice/Rachel romantic triangle was unsuccessful, and he left the show in 1983 after his character was killed off.

On New Year's Eve 1983, he joined the cast of All My Children in the role of Adam Chandler.  The following year, he was also cast as Adam's meek twin brother, Stuart, who everybody (including the audience) believed was Adam.  A May 2009 storyline had Adam accidentally shoot and kill Stuart while using prescription narcotics. Canary retired from full-time acting and departed from All My Children in 2010; his last episode was taped in late March and aired April 23, 2010. He announced that he intended to return to AMC occasionally. He reprised both of his roles as Adam and Stuart Chandler for several days before its September 23, 2011, finale on ABC. In 2013, he returned to the role of Adam when the show began to produce online episodes.

His primetime television guest appearances include Law & Order, Touched by an Angel, S.W.A.T., Primus, Alias Smith and Jones, Police Story, Kung-Fu, Hawaii Five-O, Remember WENN, and Cimarron Strip. The actor also appeared as the locomotive engineer in the movie Atomic Train. In 2004, he appeared as mathematical genius Robert in a well-reviewed production of David Auburn's Proof in Canton, Ohio, near his hometown of Massillon.

Canary had been known to be most affable and accessible to fans of both All My Children and Bonanza.  At Disney resorts, he did "meet and greet" appearances signing autographs for AMC fans. He also made several appearances at the Lake Tahoe site of the Ponderosa ranch, a tourist attraction from 1967 to 2004. His last appearance at the Ponderosa ranch in character was in 2002 for a PAX-TV special. In March 2012, David was announced as replacing the ailing 90-year-old Jack Klugman in a limited-run production of Twelve Angry Men in New Brunswick, New Jersey.

Personal life
Canary was married to actress Maureen Maloney, with whom he had a son, Chris, and a daughter, Kate. With his first wife, actress Julie M. Anderson, he had a daughter, Lisa.

Death
Canary died on November 16, 2015, of natural causes in Wilton, Connecticut at the age of 77. Canary had been diagnosed some years before with Alzheimer's disease.

Filmography

Awards and nominations
He had won five Daytime Emmy Awards as 'Outstanding Lead Actor', and had been nominated an additional 11 times, most recently in 2008 for Best Lead Actor.  A baritone, Canary has performed in such musicals as Man of La Mancha, Sweeny Todd, Kismet and Carousel, as well as performing in dramatic pieces such as The Seagull (Pittsburgh Public Theater, April 1981) and the one man play Clarence Darrow.

References

External links

 
 
 

1938 births
2015 deaths
20th-century American male actors
21st-century American male actors
Male actors from Ohio
Male actors from Indiana
American male television actors
American male soap opera actors
Daytime Emmy Award winners
Daytime Emmy Award for Outstanding Lead Actor in a Drama Series winners
University of Cincinnati – College-Conservatory of Music alumni
People from Massillon, Ohio
People from Elwood, Indiana
United States Army soldiers